Leila Rachid de Cowles (Asunción, 30 March 1955) is a Paraguayan diplomat.

Background and earlier life
Rachid studied Foreign Relations at the Universidad Católica Nuestra Señora de la Asunción (1973–1976). 
Afterwards she obtained a postgraduate degree at the Sociedad de Altos Estudios Internacionales, Madrid, Spain (1977–1978), another at the Centro de Estudios Constitucionales, Madrid, España (1978–1979) and a doctorate in Political Science at the Universidad Complutense de Madrid, Spain (1977–1979). She was Paraguayan Ambassador to the United States (2000-2003).

Foreign Minister of Paraguay
She served as Foreign Minister of Paraguay during the presidential tenure of Nicanor Duarte Frutos (15 August 2003 – 21 August 2006).

References

External links
 Minister Rachid

1955 births
People from Asunción
Paraguayan people of Lebanese descent
Universidad Católica Nuestra Señora de la Asunción alumni
Complutense University of Madrid alumni
Paraguayan women diplomats
Ambassadors of Paraguay to Argentina
Ambassadors of Paraguay to the United States
Foreign Ministers of Paraguay
Women government ministers of Paraguay
Living people
Female foreign ministers
21st-century Paraguayan women politicians
21st-century Paraguayan politicians
Women ambassadors